Made in Germany 1995–2011 is a greatest hits album by the German band Rammstein, released in December 2011. It contains 15 previously released tracks, as well as one new track, "Mein Land". All of the older tracks have been remastered for the release. The album features six different covers, depicting each of the band members' life masks. The compilation is available in three different editions: the Standard Edition (1CD), the Special Edition (2CD), and the Super Deluxe Edition (2CD + 3DVD).

Track listing

Personnel
Rammstein
Till Lindemann – lead vocals
Richard Kruspe – lead guitar, backing vocals
Paul H. Landers – rhythm guitar, backing vocals
Oliver "Ollie" Riedel – bass guitar
Christoph "Doom" Schneider – drums, percussion
Christian "Flake" Lorenz – keyboards, samples
Additional personnel
Bobo – Additional vocals on "Engel"
Sven Helbig – choir arrangements (track 4)
Dresdner Kammerchor – choir (tracks 4, 13), conducted by Andreas Pabst
Juan Sabino – sound engineer (tracks 1,8,10)
Olsen Involtini – string arrangements (tracks 8, 9, 15)
Bärbel Bühler – oboe (track 15)
Köpenicker Zupforchester – mandolin (track 15)

Charts

Weekly charts

Year-end charts

Certifications

References

External links
 

2011 greatest hits albums
German-language albums
Rammstein albums
Universal Records compilation albums